The 1914 All-Western college football team consists of American football players selected to the All-Western teams chosen by various selectors for the 1914 college football season.

All-Western selections

Ends
 Perry Graves, Illinois (CC, CON, DJ, FM-1, GH, HP, LGS, SC)
 Boyd Cherry, Ohio State (CC, CON, DJ, FC, FM-1, GH, WE-2, WW)
 Blake Miller, Michigan Agricultural (FC, HP, LA, WE-1)
 George K. Squier, Illinois (FM-2, WW)
 Bert Baston, Minnesota (SC) (CFHOF)
 Allen Elward, Notre Dame (WE-2)
 Arthur H. Gunderson, Iowa (FM-2)

Tackles
 Vic Halligan, Nebraska (CC, CON, DJ, FM-1, GH, HP, LA, LGS, SC, WE-1, WW)
 Cub Buck, Wisconsin (CC, CON, LA [guard], LGS, SC, WE-1)
 William D. Cochran, Michigan (FC, HP, WE-2)
 Laurens Shull, Chicago (FC, FM-2, LA)
 Ray Keeler,  Wisconsin (FM-1, LA [guard])
 Butler (?), Wisconsin (DJ)
 Jim Copley, Missouri Mines (WW)
 Walter Essman, Christian Brothers (GH)
 Lennox F. Armstrong, Illinois (FM-2, WE-2)

Guards
 Ralph Chapman, Illinois (CC, CON, DJ, FC, FM-1, GH, HP, LGS, SC, WE-1)
 H. B. Routh, Purdue (CC, CON, FM-2, GH, SC, WE-1, WW)
 Arlie Mucks, Wisconsin (DJ, FC, FM-1, HP, WE-2)
 Charlie Bachman, Notre Dame (LGS) (CFHOF)
 Boles Rosenthal, Minnesota (FM-2 [center], WE-2)
 Emmett Keefe, Notre Dame (FM-2)

Centers
 Paul Des Jardien, Chicago (CC, CON, DJ, FC, FM-1, GH, LA, LGS, SC, WE-1, WW [guard]) (CFHOF)
 James Raynsford, Michigan (HP, WE-2)
 John W. Watson, Illinois (WW)

Quarterbacks
 George Clark, Illinois (CC, CON, DJ, FC, FM-1, GH, HP, LA, SC, WE-2, WW)
 Dutch Bergman, Notre Dame (WE-1)
 Pete Russell, Chicago (LGS)
 Tommy Hughitt, Michigan (FM-2)

Halfbacks
 John Maulbetsch, Michigan (CC, CON, DJ, FC, FM-1, GH, HP, LA, LGS [fullback], SC,  WE-1, WW) (CFHOF)
 Harold Pogue, Illinois (CC, CON, DJ, FC, FM-1, GH, HP [fullback], LA, LGS, SC, WE-1, WW)
 Gray, Chicago (FM-2, LGS)
 Richard B. Rutherford, Nebraska (WE-2)
 Wilbur Hightower, Northwestern (WE-2)
 Guy Chamberlin, Nebraska (FM-2)

Fullbacks 
 Lorin Solon, Minnesota (CC, CON, DJ, FM-1, GH, LA [end], LGS [end], SC, WE-1 [end], WW)
 George E. Julian, Michigan Agricultural (FC, HP [halfback], LA, WE-1)
 Ray Eichenlaub, Notre Dame (WE-2)
 Eugene Schobinger, Illinois (FM-2)

Key
Bold = consensus choice by a majority of the selectors

CC = Selections of Western coaches and critics

CON = Consensus of opinion of coaches and critics compiled by E.B. Moss of the Associated Press, New York City

DJ = Dick Jemison, sporting editor Atlanta Constitution

FC = F. M. Church, sporting editor, The Michigan Daily

FM = Frank G. Menke, sporting editor of the International News Service

GH = George Henger in St. Louis Times

HP = Howard Pearson, sporting editor Detroit Journal

LA = Leonard Adams in Chicago Daily Journal

LGS = Lambert G. Sullivan in Chicago Daily News

SC = Sidney Casner, sporting editor Illinois Magazine and Daily Illini

WE = Walter Eckersall

WW = Wilbur Wood in St. Louis Republic

CFHOF = College Football Hall of Fame

See also
1914 College Football All-America Team

References

1914 Western Conference football season
All-Western college football teams